The 20th Youth in Film Awards ceremony (now known as the Young Artist Awards), presented by the Youth in Film Association, honored outstanding youth performers under the age of 21 in the fields of film and television for the 1997–1998 season, and took place on March 6, 1999, at the Sportsmen's Lodge in Studio City, California.   The hosts for the ceremony that evening were Jena Malone, R.J. Arnett, Roland Thomson, Justin Thomsom, Selwyn Ward and Tracy Lynn Cruz.

Established in 1978 by long-standing Hollywood Foreign Press Association member, Maureen Dragone, the Youth in Film Association was the first organization to establish an awards ceremony specifically set to recognize and award the contributions of performers under the age of 21 in the fields of film, television, theater and music.

Categories
★ Bold indicates the winner in each category.

Best Young Performer in a Feature Film

Best Performance in a Feature Film: Leading Young Actor
★ Miko Hughes – Mercury Rising – Universal
Michael Caloz – Little Men – Warner Bros.
Joseph Cross – Wide Awake – Miramax
Kieran Culkin – The Mighty – Miramax
Kyle Gibson – True Friends – 2nd Generation Films
Joseph Mazzello – Simon Birch – Hollywood Pictures
Eamonn Owens – The Butcher Boy – Warner Bros.
Ian Michael Smith – Simon Birch – Hollywood Pictures
Gregory Smith – Small Soldiers – DreamWorks
Kevin Zegers – Air Bud: Golden Receiver – Keystone Entertainment

Best Performance in a Feature Film: Leading Young Actress
★ (tie) Lindsay Lohan – The Parent Trap – Walt Disney Pictures
★ (tie) Jena Malone – Stepmom – Columbia Pictures
Kirsten Dunst – Small Soldiers – DreamWorks
Jennifer Love Hewitt – Can't Hardly Wait – Columbia Pictures
Scarlett Johansson – The Horse Whisperer – Touchstone Pictures
Emily Lipoma – Frog and Wombat – Pigtail Productions
Leelee Sobieski – A Soldier's Daughter Never Cries – October Films
Katie Stuart – Frog and Wombat – Pigtail Productions

Best Performance in a Feature Film: Supporting Young Actor
★ Michael Welch – Star Trek: Insurrection – Paramount
Bryan Burke – True Friends – 2nd Generation Films
Kristian De La Osa – Madeline – Tristar
Edward Furlong – American History X – New Line Cinema
Mason Gamble – Rushmore – Touchstone Pictures
Jack Johnson – Lost in Space – New Line Cinema
Cody Lightning – Smoke Signals – Miramax
Miles Marsico – Rhapsody in Bloom – Becker Films

Best Performance in a Feature Film: Supporting Young Actress
★ Brigid Tierney – Affliction – Lions Gate Films
Camilla Belle – Practical Magic – Warner Bros.
Lacey Chabert – Lost in Space – New Line Cinema
Auriol Evans – Hilary and Jackie – October Films
Keeley Flanders – Hilary and Jackie – October Films
Kyla Pratt – Dr. Dolittle – 20th Century Fox
Michelle Williams – Halloween: H20 – Miramax
Evan Rachel Wood – Practical Magic – Warner Bros.

Best Performance in a Feature Film: Young Actor Age Ten or Under
★ Liam Aiken – Stepmom – Columbia Pictures
Cameron Finley – Hope Floats – 20th Century Fox
Jason Fuchs – Mafia! – Touchstone
Darrell Johnston – Dancing at Lughnasa – Sony
Robby Seager – Splitsville – Cineville Productions

Best Performance in a Feature Film: Young Actress Age Ten or Under
★ Mae Whitman – Hope Floats – 20th Century Fox
Rachel Chamberlain – Faith – Alynne Entertainment
Alana De Roma – Amy – Cascade Films
Hallie Kate Eisenberg – Paulie – DreamWorks
Kulani Hassen – Down in the Delta – Miramax
Hatty Jones – Madeline – Tristar

Best Young Performer in a TV Movie, Pilot or Mini-Series

Best Performance in a TV Movie / Pilot / Mini-Series: Leading Young Actor
★ Ryan Merriman – Everything That Rises – TNT
Carlo Alban – Thicker Than Blood – TNT
Brendan Ryan Barrett – Logan's War: Bound By Honor – ABC
Trevor Blumas – Stranger in Town – Showtime
Jordan Kiziuk – The Island on Bird Street – Showtime

Best Performance in a TV Movie / Pilot / Mini-Series: Leading Young Actress
★ Dominique Swain – Lolita – Showtime
Kimberly J. Brown – Halloweentown – Disney Channel
Kristin Fairlie – The Sweetest Gift – Showtime
Kashmir Jones – World Upon Her Shoulder – Lifetime
Brittany Murphy – David and Lisa – ABC

Best Performance in a TV Movie / Pilot / Mini-Series: Supporting Young Actor
★ Courtland Mead – Emma's Wish – NBC
Cody Jones – Running Wild – Showtime
Eric Lloyd – Chameleon – UPN
Shawn Pyfrom – A Wing and a Prayer – USA Network
Kenny Vadas – Galileo – Family Channel
Daniel Williams – Always Outnumbered – HBO

Best Performance in a TV Movie / Pilot / Mini-Series: Supporting Young Actress
★ Haylie Duff – Addams Family Reunion – HBO
Courtney Red-Horse Mohl – Naturally Native – Independent Feature / Project West
Brooke Nevin – Running Wild – Showtime

Best Young Performer in a Television Series

Best Performance in a TV Drama or Comedy Series: Leading Young Actor
★ Zachery Ty Bryan – Home Improvement – ABC
Thomas Dekker – Honey, I shrunk the Kids – Disney
David Lago – Hollywood Safari – Animal Planet Channel
Robert Ri'chard – Cousin Skeeter – Nickelodeon
Taran Noah Smith – Home Improvement – ABC
Shawn Toovey – Dr. Quinn, Medicine Woman – CBS
Lee Thompson Young – The Famous Jett Jackson – The Disney Channel

Best Performance in a TV Drama or Comedy Series: Leading Young Actress
★ Lacey Chabert – Party of Five – FOX
Sarah Michelle Gellar – Buffy the Vampire Slayer – FOX
Brandy Norwood – Moesha – UPN
Larisa Oleynik – The Secret World of Alex Mack – Nickelodeon

Best Performance in a TV Drama Series: Supporting Young Actor
★ Ryan Merriman – The Pretender – NBC
Joseph Ashton – L.A. Doctors – CBS
Corey Sevier – Little Men – PAX
Myles Jeffrey – Early Edition – CBS
Trevor Morgan – ER – NBC
Shane Sweet – The Journey of Allen Strange – Nickelodeon
Oren Williams – Chicago Hope – CBS

Best Performance in a TV Drama Series: Supporting Young Actress
★ Scarlett Pomers – Star Trek: Voyager – UPN
Erica & Vanessa Jimenez-Alvarado – L.A. Doctors – CBS
Mae Middleton – Any Day Now – Lifetime
Sarah Rayne – Legacy – UPN
Shari Dyon Perry – Any Day Now – Lifetime
Brittany Tiplady – Millennium – FOX
Caitlin Wachs – Profiler – CBS

Best Performance in a TV Comedy Series: Supporting Young Actor
★ Eric Lloyd – Jesse – NBC
Justin Berfield – Unhappily Ever After – UPN
Justin Cooper – Brother's Keeper – ABC
Dee Jay Daniels – The Hughleys – ABC
Trevor Einhorn – Brother's Keeper – ABC
Maestro Harrell – Guys Like Us – UPN
Deon Richmond – Sister, Sister – WB
Jeffrey Schoeny – Oh Baby – Lifetime

Best Performance in a TV Comedy Series: Supporting Young Actress
★ Ashley Monique Clark – The Hughleys – ABC
Kaitlin Cullum – Grace Under Fire – ABC
Brittany & Brianna McConnell – Maggie Winters – CBS
Courtney Mun – Guys Like Us – UPN
Natasha Slayton – Brother's Keeper – ABC
Madylin Sweeten – Everybody Loves Raymond – CBS
Karle Warren – DiResta – UPN

Best Performance in a TV Drama Series: Guest Starring Young Actor
★ Seth Adkins – The Pretender – NBC
Jeremy Foley – Touched by an Angel – CBS
Craig Hauer – 7th Heaven – WB
Zack Hopkins – Promised Land – CBS
Nathan Lawrence – Touched by an Angel – CBS
Joey Pardon – High Incident – ABC
Billie Thomas – The Practice – ABC

Best Performance in a TV Drama Series: Guest Starring Young Actress
★ Chaz Monet – Any Day Now – Lifetime
Camilla Belle – Walker, Texas Ranger – CBS
Kimberly Cullum – Nothing Sacred – ABC
Olivia Marisco – Hyperion Bay – WB
Ashley Peldon – The Pretender – ABC
Nicholle Tom – Welcome to Paradox – Sci-Fi Channel
Danielle Wiener – Beverly Hills, 90210 – FOX

Best Performance in a TV Comedy Series: Guest Starring Young Actor
★ (tie) Robert Bailey Jr. – Becker – CBS
★ (tie) Bobby Brewer – Suddenly Susan – NBC
★ (tie) Bobby Edner – Step By Step – CBS
★ (tie) Sam Gifaldi – Suddenly Susan – NBC
★ (tie) Jarrett Lennon – Boy Meets World – ABC

Best Performance in a TV Comedy Series: Guest Starring Young Actress
★ (tie) Anna Chlumsky – Cupid – ABC
★ (tie) Ashley & Lindsey Trefger – Home Improvement – ABC
Courtney Peldon – Home Improvement – ABC
Caitlin Wachs – To Have & to Hold – CBS

Best Young Performer in a TV Daytime Series

Best Performance in a Daytime Serial: Young Performer
★ Adrienne Frantz – The Bold and the Beautiful – CBS
Kimberly J. Brown – Guiding Light – CBS
Ashley Monique Clark – Sunset Beach – NBC
Camryn Grimes – The Young and the Restless – CBS
Steven Hartman – The Young and the Restless – CBS
Jonathan Jackson – General Hospital – ABC
Logan O'Brien – General Hospital – ABC
Carly Schroeder – Port Charles – CBS

Best Young Performer Age 10 or Under

Best Performance in a TV Movie / Pilot / Mini-Series / Series: Young Actor Age Ten or Under
★ (tie) Paul Robert Langdon – The Spiral Staircase – CBS
★ (tie) Connor Matheus – The Hughleys – ABC
Brent Meyer – The Sweetest Gift – Showtime
Lowell Raven – Naturally Native – Independent Feature / Project West
Jacob Smith – Party of Five – FOX

Best Performance in a TV Movie / Pilot / Mini-Series / Series: Young Actress Age Ten or Under
★ Chaz Monet – Ruby Bridges – ABC
Hilary Duff – Casper Meets Wendy – FOX Channel
Britt McKillip – In the Dog House – Showtime
Carly McKillip – Stranger in Town – Showtime
Dara Perlmutter – Scandalous Me: The Jacqueline Susann Story – USA

Best Young Performer in a Voice-Over

Best Performance in a Voice-Over in a Feature or TV: Best Young Actor
★ Courtland Mead – Recess – ABC
Jonathan Taylor Thomas – The Adventures of Pinocchio – New Line Cinema 
Miko Hughes – The Rugrats Movie – Paramount
Myles Jeffrey – Babe: Pig in the City – Universal
Mathew Valencia – The New Batman/Superman Adventures – WB
Phillip Van Dyke – Hey Arnold! – Nickelodeon
Michael Yarmush – Arthur – PBS

Best Performance in a Voice-Over in a Feature or TV: Best Young Actress
★ Aria Noelle Curzon – The Prince of Egypt – DreamWorksAshley Johnson – Recess – ABC
Julia McIlvaine – KaBlam! – Nickelodeon
Hayden Panettiere – A Bug's Life – Walt Disney
Sabrina Wiener – The Wild Thornberrys – Nickelodeon

Best Young Ensemble Performance
Best Performance in a Feature Film: Young Ensemble
★ Slappy and the Stinkers – ColumbiaJoseph Ashton, Gary LeRoi Gray, Travis Tedford, Carl Michael Lindner, Scarlett Pomers3 Ninjas: High Noon at Mega Mountain – Tristar
Mathew Botuchis, Michael J. O'Laskey II, J.P. Roeske II
The Borrowers – Polygram
Bradley Pierce, Hugh Laurie, Mark Williams, Flora Newbigin

Best Performance in a TV Movie / Pilot / Made-for-Video: Young Ensemble
★ The Sweetest Gift – ShowtimeKristin Fairlie, Dylon Provencher, Marc DonatoRuby Bridges – ABC
Chaz Monet, Kiara Tucker, Whitney Tucker, Christopher Stokes
The Echo of Thunder – CBS
Lauren Hewett, Emily Jane Browning, Chelsea Yates, Ben Hanson
Bus 9 – Nickelodeon
Jessica DiCicco, Keith Franklin, Peter Tombaki, Julianne Michelle

Best Performance in a TV Series: Young Ensemble
★ Promised Land – CBSAustin O'Brien, Eddie Karr, Sarah Schaub7th Heaven – WB
Beverley Mitchell, Barry Watson, Jessica Biel, David Gallagher, Mackenzie Rosman
That '70s Show – FOX
Topher Grace, Laura Prepon, Mila Kunis, Wilmer Valderrama, Danny Masterson, Ashton Kutcher
Hiller and Diller – ABC
Kyle Sabihy, Faryn Einhorn, Jillian Berard, Jonathan Osser

Best Family Entertainment
Best Family TV Movie / Pilot / Mini-Series
★ Sabrina Goes to Rome – ABCThe Sweetest Gift – Showtime
In the Dog House – Showtime
The Echo of Thunder – CBS
Nicholas' Gift – CBS
Merlin – NBC
Everything that Rises – TNT

Best Family TV Drama Series
★ Promised Land – CBSTouched by an Angel – CBS
7th Heaven – Warner Bros.
The Journey of Allen Strange – Nickelodeon
Little Men – PAX

Best Family TV Comedy Series
★ The Hughleys – ABCSabrina, the Teenage Witch – ABC
Two of a Kind – ABC
Smart Guy – Warner Bros.
Flipper: The New Adventures – PAX

Best Educational TV Show or Series
★ From the Earth to the Moon – HBOWishbone – PBS
Bear in the Big Blue House – Disney Channel
Blue's Clues – Nickelodeon
Wild About Animals – ABC

Best Family Feature Film: Animated
★ The Prince of Egypt – DreamWorksA Bug's Life – Walt Disney Pictures
Babe: Pig in the City – Universal
Mulan – Walt Disney Pictures
Rudolph the Red-Nosed Reindeer: The Movie – Goodtimes Entertainment
The Rugrats Movie – Paramount

Best Family Feature Film: Comedy
★ The Mask of Zorro – TristarThe Borrowers – Polygram
The Parent Trap – Walt Disney Pictures
Madeline – Tristar
Paulie – DreamWorks
Patch Adams – Universal

Best Family Feature Film: Drama
★ Stepmom – ColumbiaThe Mighty – Miramax
Wide Awake – Miramax
Simon Birch – Hollywood Pictures
The Truman Show – Paramount
Star Trek: Insurrection – Paramount
Lost in Space – New Line Cinema

Special awards
The Jackie Coogan Award
Outstanding Contribution to Youth Through Motion Pictures
★ Miramax Films – For having brought to the American audience so many outstanding domestic and foreign films featuring young performers. Their precedent lives on with the Italian film: Life Is Beautiful – starring the young Giorgio Cantarini.The Michael Landon Award
Outstanding Contribution to Youth Through Television
★ CBS Television Network – For its family value shows, with particular mention of Touched by an Angel.The Former Child Star Lifetime Achievement Awards
★ Drew Barrymore★ Johnny WhitakerThe Outstanding Young Performer in a Television Commercial Award
★ Gary LeRoi Gray – For "I.H.O.P."The Community Service Award
★ Julianne Michelle – For her magnificent achievements in raising funds for charities.'''

References

External links
Official site

Young Artist Awards ceremonies
1998 film awards
1998 television awards
1999 in California
1999 in American cinema
1999 in American television